Richard Poon (born December 8, 1973) is a Filipino singer-songwriter and TV personality in the Philippines of Chinese descent.

He is a former member of the band U-Turn.

Early life
Poon was born on December 8, 1973, in Makati, Philippines. His parents, Robert Poon (from Hong Kong) and Eva Huang (from Taiwan), are of Chinese descent. He has a sister named Eva Marie.

Personal life
Poon married Maricar Reyes on June 9, 2013, at the Bellevue Hotel in Alabang, Muntinlupa.

Career
As a musician, Poon has performed in various lounges and bars across Metro Manila with his four-piece band, as well as in weddings. He used to regularly perform at Eastwood Central Plaza.

As a recording artist, he is known for covering standards and classic pop songs, including Filipino songs. He has also written songs, including "Lalala" which was performed by Regine Velasquez and Piolo Pascual for the soundtrack of their film Paano Kita Iibigin?.

Poon cites Harry Connick, Michael Bublé and Jose Mari Chan as having influenced his singing style.

Television
Poon is one of the regular performers at the Sunday variety show ASAP (ABS-CBN channel 2), usually in the ASAP Sessionistas segment together with Sitti, Aiza Seguerra (now Ice Seguerra), Juris Fernandez (formerly from pop band MYMP, Duncan Ramos (formerly from R&B Band South Border, Princess Velasco and Kean Cipriano (formerly from rock band Callalily now known as Lily).

Awards and nominations

Discography

With U-Turn

Solo albums

Christmas albums
Christmas With Richard Poon (2011)

Solo singles

References

External links

Richard Poon's official webcast courtesy of Multiply.com

Living people
21st-century Filipino male singers
Filipino people of Chinese descent
Filipino people of Hong Kong descent
Filipino people of Taiwanese descent
People from Makati
Star Magic
Universal Music Group artists
Universal Records (Philippines) artists
1973 births
Singers from Metro Manila